Mellanheden is a neighbourhood of Malmö, situated in the Borough of Västra Innerstaden, Malmö Municipality, Skåne County, Sweden.

References

Neighbourhoods of Malmö